Speranza bitactata, the split-lined speranza, is a moth in the family Geometridae. The species was first described by Francis Walker in 1862. It is found in North America.

The MONA or Hodges number for Speranza bitactata is 6304.

References

Further reading

External links

 

Macariini
Articles created by Qbugbot
Moths described in 1862